Neoregelia coriacea is a species of flowering plant in the genus Neoregelia. This species is endemic to Brazil.

Cultivars
 Neoregelia 'Night Bird'
 Neoregelia 'Rosy Dawn'
 Neoregelia 'Royal Cordovan'

References

BSI Cultivar Registry Retrieved 11 October 2009

coriacea
Flora of Brazil